Settlement of the Church of Jesus Christ of Latter-day Saints (LDS Church), also called Mormons, Latter-day Saints, or Saints in the Salt Lake Valley and surrounding area or “the planning and founding of more than 500 communities in the American West, is regarded by many planning historians as one of the most significant accomplishments in the history of American city development”. The Saints moved from settlement to settlement, until they made a permanent home in the Great Basin of the Rocky Mountains. This group of people is characterized by their ability to work together in settlement efforts. In 1847, these people trekked en masse across the great plains of the United States until they reached what is now northern Utah. Led by Brigham Young, these people used their experience of settling to establish themselves there. The church provided critical leadership by organizing and directing the efforts of the people. While Salt Lake City, the headquarters of the LDS Church, is their most prominent achievement, many other settlements in the area were also very successful. The techniques of the farm village, plats, and the grid, were all important components for the initial establishment, and later development, of the uninhabited area. The presence of the Saints in the valley was useful in the concluding efforts of the Transcontinental Railroad, where Promontory, Utah served as the connecting point of the Union Pacific and Central Pacific lines. Often labeled “the Crossroads of the West,” this area became an important hub for people traveling west, particularly for the California Gold Rush. While initially an agrarian community, the Saints became a strong force for industry as mines, factories, and rail began to be completely utilized.

Roots of settlement
The Church of Christ was the name of the original church founded by Joseph Smith in New York in 1830. Many of the early members, like Smith, came from the American northeast and therefore had been raised using the standard farming methods of the area, as well as typical methods for organizing towns and villages. Persecution, including mob violence, of church members caused Smith and his followers to move from place to place, building communities wherever they went. Smith intended to establish Zion, or a place where his people could live together in harmony. Smith's “City of Zion” was based on a self-sufficient agrarian model. In his plan, the city was to be divided so that each family had a -acre city lot to build their home and plant a garden, with one square mile of barns and crop fields surrounding the city for provisions. The saints began building in Kirtland, Ohio and parts of Missouri, such as Jackson County and Far West, then moved their headquarters to Nauvoo, Illinois. “As they transformed the city of Nauvoo from a few log houses to a bustling center of substantial homes and business,” they confronted more intense persecution, including the assassination of their leader Joseph Smith, and the Saints decided to leave once more. They migrated from the Midwest to the Salt Lake Valley, under the leadership of their new leader, Brigham Young.

Central institution
The driving force in the settlement of the Salt Lake Valley was the LDS Church, with most of the people living there being church members. This group was familiar with establishing towns, where they all lived and worked together, and promoted the concept of Zion. The motivation for Latter-day Saint migration was not wealth or fame, but religion. Since its earliest days, missionary work had been a prominent responsibility of the church and its members. Proselyting efforts to gain more followers and bring them to Zion played a critical role in the immigration to Utah, which provided manpower for settlement. The Perpetual Emigration Fund was established to finance the travels of converts to Utah. Young had envisioned that the “desert blossom as a rose," and this vision was coming to pass as thousands of Americans, and foreigners alike, joined the Saints in the Salt Lake Valley and contributed greatly to their mission.

Theodemocracy
Given the overwhelming population of Latter-day Saints, it was clear that the LDS Church would hold substantial power, and therefore would provide government-like order. A Theodemocracy was instituted, which essentially combined church and state.  The church is organized with a lay ministry, beginning with the president and his counselors, who form the First Presidency and who have oversight for all areas, the Quorum of the Twelve Apostles and other general authorities, who are assigned responsibility over specified areas, then local leaders of stakes and wards. There were also tribunals that acted as basic court systems, however, there were no lawyers. “The lines of authority led from his hands [Young’s], through the hands of divisional leaders, to the most remote settlement”. The church's organization and authority greatly aided in settlement planning and execution.

The men appointed by Young typically possessed strong leadership skills and had significant experience with settlement operations:

“The Mormon settlers were characterized by leadership as well as a remarkable willingness to follow those in authority… That potent force springs from the fervent and almost mystic reverence of the devotees of the Mormon faith for the ecclesiastical organization with which they are affiliated”.

The influx of non-Mormons, as well as a desire to obtain statehood, prompted the church to re-evaluate its system. The Saints established a more recognizable type of government and proposed the State of Deseret, with all three branches of government: legislative, judiciary, and executive. Instead, however, the Territory of Utah was formed by an act of Congress in 1850, with Brigham Young as governor. Even with this new government in place, the Church's influence was still overwhelmingly present. The church's leaders taught their people that they were establishing the Kingdom of God, like that of ancient Israel, upon the earth(“Our Heritage”). The leadership of the Saints in Utah under Young has been described as “a completely organized and efficient ecclesiastical machine”.

Brigham Young

“The story of the colonization of the Great Basin is inseparably connected with the life and activities of Brigham Young” (Hunter 8). To the Saints, their prophet Brigham Young was God's messenger on the earth and therefore his word was God's word. Under his direction, Salt Lake City was constructed to be the headquarters, while other areas were developed under his watchful care. Young has been characterized as a skilled leader, with contrasting personality and ability from the church's founder, Joseph Smith. “Young inspired his followers by his down-to-earth demeanor and through his skills as a pragmatic organizer and executive”. His followers obeyed, respected, admired, and loved him.

Upon viewing the Salt Lake Valley, Young declared: “This is the place”. This declaration ended his people's trek and designated the new place that they would begin to settle and develop. The immediate area was surveyed by Orson Pratt, designating the temple site, and the model settlement of Salt Lake City. After beginning the first settlement, Young sent parties of explorers to search the rest of the Salt Lake Valley. These parties included men like Albert Carrington, who was sent to the southern part of the valley, and Jesse Little, who was sent to the northern part. After receiving reports from the explorers, Young directed clergymen and craftsmen to be sent in settlement groups to specified locations. These men were personally chosen by Young himself and were extended a church calling to fulfil the mission of settlement in their area. He would then continually follow up, and supervise, their efforts. This was done through personal visits, often being highly critical of his findings. Young thought that isolation and demand for hard work would be character building for his people and the Salt Lake Valley seemed to possess the ideal qualities. “Each month… brought more vividly to Brigham’s mind a broader conception of its resources”. With ample manpower at his command, these resources could be fully utilized at his discretion.

Settlement

Geography
The Intermountain West was “drier and colder…more rugged… and less accessible,” making the geographical differences from the Mississippi River Valley, their former home, quite profound. With the Salt Lake Valley between the Wasatch Mountains on the east, the Oquirrh Mountains on the west, Traverse Ridge to the south, and the Great Salt Lake to the northwest, the valley provided the desired isolation from other settlers. The church leaders’ assessment of the area was “based on the reports of trappers, explorers, and erstwhile immigrant recruiters trying to attract settlers to the Oregon or California territories”. Lansford Hastings said that the area “offers inducements to no civilized people, sufficient to justify an expectation of permanent settlements,” however, John Fremont's more favorable report inspired the church leaders to select the Salt Lake Valley as their destination.

Beginnings
The Saints arrived late in the season, which necessitated a rush to plant crops such as potatoes and corn to meet their needs for the coming winter and provide seeds for the following spring. Jim Bridger had told the newcomers that nothing would ever grow in the Salt Lake Valley, mainly because the ground was so hard. In fact, it was so hard that it broke some of the pioneers’ plows.  In order to soften the ground, the pioneers built a dam in nearby City Creek to flood the ground, which was successful (Alexander). Some of the Saints had learned irrigation techniques while serving missions, in places such as Italy, so they understood how to “dam streams and channel water in ditches to irrigate the crops”. With two decades of experience in establishing settlements, the Saints were well on their way, however, the first year proved to be nearly disastrous as they acclimated to the harsh winter that they had barely managed to prepare for. In hindsight, it's impressive that the Saints survived the first ten years of settlement, which including harsh winds, rains, snows, frosts, and insect pests.

Salt Lake City
The headquarters for the church had been determined by Young, after publicly proclaiming the site for the Salt Lake Temple: “Here we will build a temple to our God”. The surrounding area underwent immediate planning because it would serve as the heart of their new city. One of the first buildings was “the bowery,” which was a simple structure designed to be a temporary facility for worship and school. A fence was built, encompassing the city center, in order to provide protection from Indians and the cold winter winds. Inside of the fence, log homes and adobes were constructed for housing. A school was built but at first it didn't contain desks, chairs, or other supplies. Later the Saints built tables from wagon parts and windows from cloth, which had been used and stretched into form. The city progressed rapidly and was eventually described as “one of the prettiest cities,” “impressive,” and “magnificent,” with “the grandiose scale of the city [striking] all observers”.

Other areas
Bountiful, named after an ancient American city referenced in the Book of Mormon, was the second settlement. Shortly after the pioneers' arrival, Perrigrine Sessions was sent by Young to explore the area just north of Salt Lake City. In September 1847 Sessions gathered his family into their wagon and herded 300 head of cattle into the South Davis Valley. Other families moved into the area and began planting crops the following year. Fifty-three families had established farms in the area by 1850. The process of “leapfrogging,” or skipping areas to settle more distant ones, was used for further settlement. In the first decade, some ninety settlements were founded. Tribes such as the Utes and Shoshone occupied parts of the Great Basin and the ever expanding settlement of the Saints pushed the Indians from their fertile lands. While the Saints did offer some food to help compensate, their relations with the Indians were less than ideal. This continual encroachment on their land caused conflict that led to some violence between the two groups but eventually many of the Indians left for reservations and other lands.

49ers
Around the same time that the Saints began to settle the Salt Lake Valley, word had spread throughout the United States that gold had been discovered in California. Following the winter, many fortune hunters, or 49ers, started to head west to join in the gold rush. On their journey west, a fair amount of these people detoured from the popular path and went through Salt Lake City.  This route was not the quickest to California, but for the fortune hunters they looked to Salt Lake City as a place to recoup from illness and fatigue, stock up on supplies, and rest their tired animals. During this time the Saints in the valley were struggling. The city was still being established, only having about 6,000 residents, and the people had barely survived two disastrous harvests due to drought, frost, and cricket infestation. The Saints and the 49ers mutually benefited from each other. The Saints received outside supplies, i.e. consumer goods and farm implements, and the 49ers received critical aid during their rest stop in the valley. The relationship between the two was generally positive, despite some accounts of conflict. Many of the members were successful in their findings and brought back large amounts of gold dust. The gold was used to mint gold coins wherein the church used this for financing and to establish the Deseret Mint until paper currency was issued. 1849 brought the miracle of economic development that gold would contribute to in the valley. Another advantage of the Saints’ encounter with the Gold rushers was that it established patterns for future travel to the west coast. When the planning of the Transcontinental Railroad was laid out, experts chose the route through the valley, which helped make Salt Lake City a base for later mercantile and exploration efforts.

Techniques

Settlement in the Salt Lake Valley followed Young's modified version of Smith's “City of Zion." Young followed this plan in the Salt Lake Valley instead of following the common methods used in other parts of the western United States. Settlement tactics included three main traits: the plat, the grid, and the farm village. The goal of these traits was to help foster equality, proximity to the church, organization and solidarity, and close family relationships.

The plat

The plat was the central concept, which was the organization of farming and commercial activities surrounding the community center. As stated in a Church News article:
“The Mormon communities were agriculturally sustainable. They were laid out in a grid of 10-acre blocks, with a community center containing cultural, school, religious and commercial activities. Farming was conducted in surrounding greenbelts outside the city. The plat provided for neighborhood structure (wards), modern zoning (separation of incompatible uses), and land use regulations (residences set back from the street with a fine, well-maintained garden, or grove in the front yard)”

The grid
The grid, defined as a network of squares formed by perpendicular lines, is the second organizing structure and a characteristic for which Salt Lake City has become renowned. The Latter-day Saint settlers created a city where the center was the temple, or holy space, influenced by ancient cities of the Bible. The grid allowed for efficient organization of other activities around their temple according to the plat design. Brigham Young felt that the streets of Salt Lake needed to be large enough to allow a horse-drawn wagon to turn around. This was an important foresight for later transportation development of the city. Another advantage of the grid was to organize the city so that all persons, visiting or permanent residents, could know where to go to find the commercial or religious building they needed.

The farm village
The more rural areas followed a slightly modified method of the plat. The “farm village” shared the same goal of the plat, making community buildings easily accessible to all, but differed in that the farming activities where often located in the center of the city with all other buildings. Thus the separation, or zoning, of various activities was less distinct.

Development

Agrarian
The Salt Lake Valley was founded first upon an agrarian system and later combined this with non-agrarian techniques by way of manufacturing and the use of the railroad. The early agrarian development began by appointing crews to “plow, plant, survey, build fences, saw timber, build a public shelter, and explore". Their agrarian system was composed of proper irrigation for successful farming of staple crops. Since it was already late in the season, being July, plowing and irrigating occurred around the clock. Between July 23 and the 28th eighty-four acres had been farmed with corn, potatoes, beans, buckwheat, and turnips. In the north, semi-tropical crops were grown such as cotton, grapes, sugar cane, madder, mulberries, and indigo. The techniques of working, tilling, plowing, and irrigating the earth for planting was vital in the success of their agricultural development. “Brigham Young stressed agriculture as the essential base for developing the Mormon Kingdom” (Hinton, 1988, p. 70). It was also stressed that as a people there would be greater success in developing the valley by working together, rather than individually.

Non-agrarian

After basic agrarian settlement, the saints were in demand of goods that came from outside their territory, wherein there was a lack in purchasing power due to high transportation costs for goods produced outside of the valley, this pushed them into manufacturing closer to home. After conquering the desert in agriculture, the saints were confident in their own strength, courage, and leadership to succeed in the manufacturing industry.  Infant industry occurred within the home level, when Brigham Young stated:

“Produce what you consume; draw from the native element the necessities of life; permit no vitiated taste to lead you into the indulgence of expensive luxuries, which can only be obtained by involving yourself in debt; let home industry produce every article of home consumption”.

Eventually skilled artisans and mechanics automatically dropped into their chosen trade including those that ground grain, sawed timber, blacksmithing, carpentering, and shoe making.

The construction of the Salt Lake Temple helped further motivate the Saints to establish an effective industrial base. Until the introduction of rail, teams of oxen hauled raw materials from the mountains, which was a lengthy and dangerous process. Young admonished his people to add their labor power to the Transcontinental Railroad lines, which would meet at Promontory Point. In 1862 Lincoln signed the Pacific Railroad Act that would allow for the rail to reach the Salt Lake valley. Hon Farr, the Mayor of Ogden, in a speech, voiced his joy: “Hail to the great highway of the nations, Utah bids you welcome! Once the rail was introduced in the valley, seven additional lines were built to transport heavy materials, such as granite, from distant areas, as well as to transport people.

See also
 Mormon pioneers
 Kingdom of God (Christianity)

Notes

References
 Alexander, Thomas G. Settlement and Exploration. 2013. http://historytogo.utah.gov/utah_chapters/pioneers_and_cowboys/settlementandexploration.html (accessed Nov 15, 2013).
 Arrington, L. J. (1958). Great basin kingdom: An economic history of the latter-day saints 1830-1900. Cambridge, Massachusetts: Harvard University Press.
 Bringhurst, Newell G. "Brigham Young." Utah History To Go. http://historytogo.utah.gov/people/brighamyoung.html (accessed Oct 2013).
 Deseret News Publishing Company. "1833 'Plat of Zion' Wins National Honor." Church News, May 25, 1996.
 The Church of Jesus Christ of Latter-day Saints. Our Heritage: A Brief History of The Church of Jesus Christ of Latter-day Saints. 1996.
 see Our Heritage pp 5-19
 see Our Heritage pp 81-91
 The Church of Jesus Christ of Latter-day Saints. “Lesson 41: The Saints Settle the Salt Lake Valley,” Primary 5: Doctrine and Covenants: Church History (1997) p. 238
 Hinton, W. K. (1988). Utah: unusual beginning to unique present. Northridge, California: Windsor Publications, Inc.
 "How the Church is Organized". The Church of Jesus Christ of Latter-day Saints, 8 Dec 2013. Web. 14 Dec 2013. <http://www.churchofjesuschrist.org/topics/church-organization/how-the-church-is-organized?lang=eng>.
 Hunter, Milton. Brigham Young the Colonizer. Salt Lake City: The Deseret News Press, 1940. 13. Print.
 Jackson, Richard. "The Geography and Settlement of the Intermountain West: Creating an American Mecca." Journal of the West 33, no. 3 (1994).
 Jensen, Richard. "Perpetual Emigrating Fund Company."Utah History To Go. State of Utah, 8 Dec 2013. Web. 14 Dec 2013. <http://historytogo.utah.gov/utah_chapters/pioneers_and_cowboys/settlementandexploration.html>.
 Mormon Pioneer Trail History. http://www.utah.com/mormon/pioneer_trail_history.htm (accessed Oct 2013).
 Neff, A. L. (1940).  History of utah: 1847 to 1869. Salt Lake City, Utah: The Deseret News Press.
 Nelson, E. R. (1958). Utah’s economic patterns. Salt Lake City, Utah: University of Utah Press.
 Scott, Patricia. "Bountiful." Utah History To Go. State of Utah, 8 Dec 2013. Web. 14 Dec 2013. < http://historytogo.utah.gov/utah_chapters/pioneers_and_cowboys/bountiful.html >.

History of Utah
History of the Church of Jesus Christ of Latter-day Saints